Irina Nikulchina (born 8 December 1974 in Razlog) is a Bulgarian biathlete.

At the 2002 Winter Olympics in Salt Lake City she won a bronze medal in the 10 km pursuit competition. She also competed in the cross-country skiing events in 1994 and 1998, and the biathlon at the 2006 Winter Olympics.

References

1974 births
Living people
Bulgarian female biathletes
Bulgarian female cross-country skiers
Olympic biathletes of Bulgaria
Olympic cross-country skiers of Bulgaria
Olympic bronze medalists for Bulgaria
Cross-country skiers at the 1994 Winter Olympics
Cross-country skiers at the 1998 Winter Olympics
Biathletes at the 2002 Winter Olympics
Biathletes at the 2006 Winter Olympics
Olympic medalists in biathlon
Macedonian Bulgarians
Medalists at the 2002 Winter Olympics
People from Razlog
Sportspeople from Blagoevgrad Province
20th-century Bulgarian women
21st-century Bulgarian women